Vênus were a Brazilian heavy metal group from Teresina, active during the 1980s. They were the first band from the Brazilian Northeast to record a heavy metal album and were very influential on the local music scene.

History 
Vênus were a heavy metal band which played in the Brazilian music scene in the 1980s. The group was formed in early 1982 in Teresina, Piauí, with Pincel on bass, Kinha on drums, Nenê on lead guitar, and Thyrso Marechal on vocals and rhythm guitar.

In 1986 they began to record their first (and eventually their only) self-titled album. At that time, shortly before the start of the recording, the new singer left the band and Thyrso Marechal took back the lead vocal duties and provided lead vocals on the album. In the cover art created for the album, the front cover featured the sunset seen from the Parnaíba River amidst the zodiacal table and the back cover showed a silhouette of the band members in gray, reflecting the concept underlying the lyrics: ecology, mysticism and anti-racism.

After recording the album, João Filho took over the vocals and with this new line-up the group toured the North of Brazil, and then went to São Paulo to promote the album. In São Paulo the band did two concerts officially captured on film, and the album received positive reviews from music critics, including a positive review published in a 1986 edition of the traditional Brazilian magazine Rock Brigade. The album features songs with blistering guitar duets and lyrics in Portuguese, and despite the scarcity of technical resources used in the recording of the album, it is currently recognized as one of the forerunners of heavy metal in Brazilian Northeast and one of the oldest heavy metal albums of that country sung in Portuguese, in addition to an amazing musical quality in the context of the style called by the fans, in that decade, of "metal nacional" (English: "national metal").

Also in 1986 the band played again in Festival Setembro Rock, alongside bands such as A Chave do Sol, Megahertz and others. After achieving some recognition singing lyrics in Portuguese, playing long duets of guitar and having influenced the Brazilian heavy metal scene, the band split up unexpectedly in the late 1980s.

Vênus reunited for several isolated performances in the years 1988 and 1989 with a final line-up that included the then unknown guitarist Erisvaldo Borges, who composed a few tracks for the band with influences of classical music, in the vein of the neoclassicism of Yngwie Malmsteen, but these tracks were never recorded. These reunions did not continue for long until the band broke up permanently at the end of 1989.

Both the group and the album are listed in one of the most prominent encyclopedic references of Brazilian rock: the "ABZ do Rock Brasileiro", by Marcelo Dolabela.

After the end of Vênus, guitarists Ico and Thyrso went on to form the seminal Brazilian band Avalon; Thyrso did not stay long and, after leaving Avalon, joined the first line-up (1991) of the band Scud, playing on the first recording of that group (called "Lampião") that is still active in the Brazilian rock scene. Currently, Thyrso is a member of the band "Radiofônicos", a rock'n'roll and blues-rock band, and also of Retrorock a Classic hard rock cover band.

Guitarist Ico Almendra in his turn played on all Avalon albums and then moved to the United States, where he lives with his family to this day. After some time away from music, he went on to compose and record. His first solo album was released in the U.S. in 2005 under the name of Frank Krischman. The second one was recorded in 2007 and called "Full Bloom", and for the recording of this album Ico teamed up with the paulistana singer Olivia. The distribution of this second album was good and it was critically acclaimed, earning a nomination for the Brazilian Dynamite magazine awards as Best Album of the Year. These two Krischman's albums are in the vein of acoustic folk rock. In Austin, Texas he has also participated in several music projects, all somehow involving Brazilian music. He was a member of "The Flying Club", a band from Texas with one released album (Far and Away – 2006), which mixes American pop with MPB. He is also a member of many other Brazilian and World music projects such as Seu Jacinto, being this last one his solo effort where he also sings and mixes all his diverse music background with rock elements, all under the name of Frank Almendra

Erisvaldo Borges abandoned the use of electric guitars since the late 1990s and became a classical guitarist recognized in national and international scene, releasing eleven instrumental CDs and currently serves as the event manager for the Festival Nacional de Violão do Piauí – Fenavipi which takes place annually, with the performances of classical guitarists from various Brazilian states, as well as abroad.

Formation

Discography 
 1986: Vênus

References

External links 
 Metaleros
 Audio Site

Brazilian heavy metal musical groups
Musical groups established in 1982
Musical groups disestablished in 1989
1982 establishments in Brazil
1989 disestablishments in Brazil